Ted Flemming may refer to:

 Ted Flemming (politician), Canadian politician
 Ted Flemming (footballer) (born 1902), Australian rules footballer